Harry Trelawny may refer to:
Sir Harry Trelawny, 5th Baronet (1687–1762), British officer
Harry Trelawny (1726–1800), British general and Coldstream Guards officer, nephew of the 5th Baronet
Sir Harry Trelawny, 7th Baronet (1756–1834), Protestant preacher and convert to Roman Catholicism, nephew of the general

See also
Henry Trelawny